This article presents a list of the historical events and publications of Australian literature during 1997.

Events 

 David Foster won the Miles Franklin Award for The Glade Within the Grove

Major publications

Novels 

 Peter Carey (writer), Jack Maggs
 Richard Flanagan, The Sound of One Hand Clapping
 Rod Jones (author), Nightpictures
 Madeleine St John, The Essence of the Thing

Children's and young adult fiction 

 Damien Broderick and Rory Barnes, Zones
 Kim Caraher, Up a Gum Tree
 Isobelle Carmody
 Darkfall
 Greylands
 Gary Crew and Michael O'Hara (writer), The Blue Feather
 Sonya Hartnett, Princes
 Catherine Jinks, Eye to Eye
 Garth Nix, Shade's Children
 Sarah Walker (Australian author), The Year of Freaking Out

Poetry 

 Peter Boyle (poet), The Blue Cloud of Crying
 Alison Croggon, The Blue Gate
 Philip Hodgins, Selected Poems
 Jill Jones (poet), The Book of Possibilities
 Emma Lew, The Wild Reply
 Rhyll McMaster, Chemical Bodies: A diary of probable events, 1994–1997

Drama 

 Hilary Bell (writer), Wolf Lullaby
 Leah Purcell and Scott Rankin, Box the Pony
 Katherine Thomson, Navigating
 David Williamson, After the Ball

Science fiction and fantasy 

 Sara Douglass 
 Sinner
 Threshold
 Greg Egan, Diaspora
 Kim Wilkins, The Infernal

Non-fiction 

 Mark Raphael Baker, The Fiftieth Gate
 Barbara Blackman, Glass after Glass
 Lynne Hume, Witchcraft and Paganism in Australia
 Roberta Sykes, Snake Cradle

Awards and honours 

 Morris West  "for service to literature"
 Barbara Buick  "for service to women, particularly through Equal Employment Opportunity Tribunal in Western Australia and to librarianship and publishing, particularly through the promotion of children's literature"
 Ken Goodwin (academic)  "for service to literature, art administration and education"
 Manfred Jurgensen  "for service to literature as a novelist, poet and critic, and as founder of the journal Outrider"
 Edna Laing  "for service to the arts and literature through the Creativity Centre, Brisbane"
 Rodney Lumer  "for service to the arts through the promotion and publication of works by Australian playwrights"
 Sydney John Trigellis-Smith  "for service to military history as a researcher, author and publisher of several unit histories of campaigns of World War II"
 Albert Ullin  "for service to the promotion of children's literature in Australia and overseas"

Deaths 
A list, ordered by date of death (and, if the date is either unspecified or repeated, ordered alphabetically by surname) of deaths in 1997 of Australian literary figures, authors of written works or literature-related individuals follows, including year of birth.

 14 February — Marian Eldridge, short story writer, poet and book reviewer (born 1936)
 16 February — Gilbert Mant, journalist and writer (born 1902)
 14 April — Kit Denton, writer and broadcaster (born 1928)
 8 June — George Turner, writer and critic, best known for science fiction novels (born 1916)
 11 June — Jill Neville, novelist, playwright and poet (born 1932)
 16 June — Dal Stivens, novelist and short story writer (born 1911)
 19 June — David Denholm, author and historian who published fiction under the pseudonym David Forrest and history under his own name (born 1924)
 1 July — David Martin, novelist, poet, playwright, journalist, editor, literary reviewer and lecturer (born 1915)
 2 August — Joyce Dingwell, writer of more than 80 romance novels for Mills & Boon from 1931 to 1986, who also wrote under the pseudonym of Kate Starr (born 1909)

Unknown date

 Roger Bennett (playwright), actor and playwright (born 1948)

See also 

 1997 in Australia
 1997 in literature
 1997 in poetry
 List of years in literature
 List of years in Australian literature

References 

1997 in Australia
Australian literature by year
20th-century Australian literature
1997 in literature